Franck Zio (born 14 August 1971) is a retired Burkinabé long jumper. This is the current Burkinabé record.

Competition record

1No mark in the final

References

External links
 

1971 births
Living people
Burkinabé long jumpers
Athletes (track and field) at the 1992 Summer Olympics
Athletes (track and field) at the 1996 Summer Olympics
Olympic athletes of Burkina Faso
Male long jumpers
Burkinabé male athletes
Athletes (track and field) at the 1999 All-Africa Games
African Games competitors for Burkina Faso
21st-century Burkinabé people